is the second single by Japanese recording artist Arisa Mizuki. It was released on August 28, 1991 as the second single from Mizuki's debut studio album Arisa. The title song was written by Jun Taguchi and composed and produced by Princess Princess vocalist and guitarist Kaori Okui. The song is Mizuki's only A-side to not have a commercial tie-in.

Chart performance 
"Eden no Machi" debuted on the Oricon Weekly Singles chart at number 5 with 59,830 copies sold in its first week. The single charted for eleven weeks and has sold a total of 181,420 copies. "Eden no Machi" was the 10th best-selling single of September 1991 and ranked number 91 on the Oricon Yearly Singles chart.

Track listing

Charts

References 

1991 singles
Alisa Mizuki songs
1991 songs
Songs written by Kaori Kishitani